Pardis Ahmadieh (born June 29, 1992) is an Iranian actress. She is best known for her performance in Red Nail Polish (2016). She has received various accolades, including a Hafez Award and an Urban International Film Festival Award, in addition to nomination for an Iran Cinema Celebration Award.

Career

2007–2015: Career beginnings
In the age of 15, she was introduced to Afshin Sadeghi by director Hamid Nematollah for her role in the film Imitator of The Devil (2007).

Later in 2010, she starred in two films Butterflies and Broken.

She played as Fereshteh in the 2011 drama series The Recall.

From 2012 to 2015 she starred in three films and a short film, Hiding in the Open (Short film, 2012), Actors Studio (2013), Hail and Sun, and The Girl's House (both 2015).

2016: First lead role
She got her first lead role in Seyyed Jamal Seyyed Hatami's Red Nail Polish (2016) where she was chosen from 500 actresses who auditioned for the role.

For her performance in the film, she gained attention and received critical acclaim, winning Best Actress award at the Urban International Film Festival, in addition to nominations for a Hafez Award and an Iran Cinema Celebration award.

2017–2019: Major roles
She acted alongside Navid Mohammadzadeh and Elnaz Shakerdoost in Fereydoun Jeyrani's Asphyxia (2017), earning her second Hafez Award nomination.

In 2019, she starred alongside Baran Kosari, Sara Bahrami and Jamshid Hashempour in the drama film Repression.

In September 2019, she joined the cast of the film A minor directed by Dariush Mehrjoui. The film premiered in 2022.

2020–present: Wide recognition
In 2020 she starred in Tooman directed by Morteza Farshbaf and received critical acclaim and Best Actress award at the 21st Hafez Awards.

Later she played as Golbahar, a sixteen-year-old homeless girl who has been producing and selling babies since she was 11 years old in Reza Dormishian's No Choice (2020). The film screened for the first time at the 33rd Tokyo International Film Festival.

She acted in the episode five of the 2021 horror drama series Them alongside Mojtaba Pirzadeh her frequent partner.

On September 3, 2021, it was announced that Ahmadieh will star in the fantasy drama series Lily's Turn as Lily directed by Rouhollah Hejazi.

On June 10, 2022, it was announced that Ahmadieh will star as Sahel in the crime drama series The Lion Skin alongside Shahab Hosseini, Hadi Hejazifar and Pantea Bahram directed by Jamshid Mahmoudi.

Filmography

Film

Web

Television

Awards and nominations

References

External links 

1992 births
Living people
People from Tehran
Actresses from Tehran
Iranian female models
Iranian film actresses
Iranian stage actresses
Iranian television actresses
21st-century Iranian actresses